Cork Street is a street in Mayfair in the West End of London, England, with many contemporary art galleries, and was previously associated with the tailoring industry. It is part of the Burlington Estate, which was developed from the 18th century.

Location
The street runs approximately north-west from the junction of Burlington Arcade with Burlington Gardens, and is close to Burlington House, which houses the Royal Academy of Arts. It is parallel to, and immediately to the east of, New Bond Street. The nearest tube station is Green Park.

History

Cork Street is part of the Burlington Estate, which was developed from the 18th century. The first Earl of Burlington was Richard Boyle (1612–1698), 2nd Earl of Cork; the street is named for that city.

The street in particular and the area in general was associated with tailors. In particular, the leading Regency London tailors Schweitzer and Davidson were located in Cork Street. Beau Brummell (1778–1840), who introduced the flamboyant form of gentleman's fashion that became known as dandyism, patronised Schweitzer and Davidson in Cork Street. Savile Row, not far from Cork Street to the east, is today the street most associated with high-quality gentleman's tailors.

In the early 20th century, the street became associated with the art world. Cork Street is today known in the art world for its many commercial art galleries. It is close to the Royal Academy on Piccadilly to the south, which has an interest in the artistic nature of the street.  there were 22 galleries in the street.

The street is considered to be one of the United Kingdom's "most important art hubs". The galleries of Cork Street have launched the careers of many major modern artists in Britain. For example, the Mayor Gallery was the venue for the first London exhibitions of Francis Bacon, Max Ernst, Paul Klee, and Joan Miró. Peggy Guggenheim opened her 'Guggenheim Jeune' art gallery at number 30 in 1938.

The art dealer Lillian Browse was nicknamed "The Duchess of Cork Street", and used that name as the title of her autobiography.

Attack on Cork Street
 
In 1985 the Grey Organisation, a radical arts collective, launched an attack on Cork Street covering some of the galleries in grey paint. In a press release, GO justified the attacks on Cork Street, describing the galleries established there as "boring and lifeless", stating that the attacks were "intended to liven up their lives a bit!". The attack took place on Tuesday 21 May 1985, somewhere between midnight and 6am. Members of the Grey Organisation were later arrested, released on bail and banned from central London, but when prosecuted at Well Street Magistrates' court, pleaded 'Not Guilty' and were released without charge.

Campaign
In 2012 the Save Cork Street campaign was created to protect Cork Street as a contemporary arts district. With 13,000 supporters, including David Hockney and Sir Peter Blake, the Save Cork Street campaign attracted major press interest. Chaired by artist and curator Simon Tarrant, the Save Cork Street committee petitioned Westminster Council to stipulate gallery usage for future Cork Street developments.

Galleries 
- Lisson Gallery
- Waddington Custot
- Browse & Darby
- Saatchi Yates
- The Mayor Gallery
- The Redfern Gallery

See also
 Burlington Arcade, opposite the south end of Cork Street
 Dover Street, a street nearby in Mayfair with many art galleries

References

Streets in the City of Westminster
Cork Street
Art gallery districts
Arts in London
Regency London
Mayfair